The Ski Bum is a 1971 American drama film directed by Bruce D. Clark, written by Bruce D. Clark and Marc Siegler, and starring Zalman King, Charlotte Rampling, Joseph Mell, Dimitra Arliss, Tedd King and Dwight Marfield. Based on the 1965 novel The Ski Bum by Romain Gary, it was released by Embassy Pictures.

Plot
Ski instructor Johnny is carrying on a romance with Samantha, a married woman who also serves as the hostess at a ski lodge. Samantha coaxes Jack into giving skiing lessons to the Stones, a rich family whose patriarch is the head of a mysterious company planning to take over the resort.

Cast      
Zalman King as Johnny
Charlotte Rampling as Samantha
Joseph Mell as Burt Stone
Dimitra Arliss as Liz Stone
Tedd King as Maxwell Enderby
Dwight Marfield as Doctor Walter Graham
Freddie James as Brad Stone
Lori Shelle as Lisa Stone
Pierre Jalbert as Roger
Anna Karen Morrow as Golda Lanning
Paul Jabara as Rocco
Michael Lerner as Rod
Don Campbell as Randy
Noah Keen as Marty
David Chow as Otto
Penelope Spheeris as Star the Witch
Deborah Smaller as Janey

Background
Joseph E. Levine bought the rights to make a film out of the Romain Gary story in 1964, but spent years trying to get a suitable screenplay; those who worked on the project included author and critic Hollis Alpert. At various times Peter O'Toole, Christopher Jones, Warren Beatty and Jon Voight were reportedly considered for the starring role; Robert Redford was also approached but turned the part down. Finally Levine gave a trio of UCLA film students a $750,000 budget and free rein to do what they wanted, resulting in a film that had little to do with the book.

Reception
Roger Greenspun of The New York Times wrote, "Almost everybody in 'The Ski Bum' is first rate, much too good for the material, with special honors to Joseph Mell as the ubiquitous Burt Stone and Lori Shelle as his emotionally mature daughter." Gene Siskel of the Chicago Tribune gave the film zero stars out of four and wrote that the young filmmakers "are moderately successful only when photographing snow. Each scene involving what they think is human interaction is either sick or sickly. The film's electronic music and many echo chamber sound effects (which signal trauma) end up being the equivalent of scratches on a blackboard." Variety wrote that the changes from the novel to the film were "mostly for the worst" and that there was "very little to say about the final cut, since film has so little to say itself." Jeanne Miller of The San Francisco Examiner called the film "an earnest, thoughtful, but ultimately unsuccessful attempt to portray the anguish of its existential hero, a primitive drifter hopelessly trapped in the externals of a materialistic society ... [the filmmakers] seem to view the corporate greed of this affluent society as an insidious poison that inevitably affects everyone it touches. Unfortunately, they were unable to translate their concept into fluid, moving or authoritative cinematic terms."

Notes

References

External links
 
 

1971 films
1971 drama films
American drama films
Films based on French novels
American skiing films
Films directed by Bruce D. Clark
Embassy Pictures films
1970s English-language films
1970s American films